Best Night of My Life is the fourth studio album by American singer and actor Jamie Foxx. It was released on December 21, 2010, by J Records. The album was supported by four singles in total; "Winner" featuring Justin Timberlake and T.I., "Living Better Now" featuring Rick Ross, "Fall for Your Type" featuring Drake and "Best Night of My Life" featuring Wiz Khalifa.

Upon its release, Best Night of My Life was met with generally mixed reviews from music critics. The album debuted at number six on the US Billboard 200 chart, selling 144,000 copies in its first week.

Background 
The album was originally scheduled to be released under the title Body.

Promotion 
On November 16, 2009, the song titled "Speak French" featuring Gucci Mane, was released as the buzz single.

Singles 
"Winner" featuring Justin Timberlake and T.I., was released as the album's lead single on April 6, 2010.

The album's second single "Living Better Now" featuring Rick Ross was released as a digital download on November 2, 2010. It officially impacted Rhythmic and Urban radio in the US on November 9, 2010.

"Fall For Your Type" featuring Drake, was released as the album third single on November 12, 2010.

"Best Night of My Life" featuring Wiz Khalifa, was released as the album's fourth single on April 5, 2011.

Promotional singles 
"Yep Dat's Me" featuring Ludacris and Soulja Boy, was released as the album's first promotional single on December 17, 2010. Another version of the song, which features T.I. was released as well.

Critical reception

Best Night of My Life was met with generally mixed reviews from music critics. At Metacritic, which assigns a normalized rating out of 100 to reviews from mainstream critics, the album received an average score of 58, which indicates "mixed or average reviews", based on 9 reviews. In a mixed review, David Jeffries of Allmusic wrote that, "If Best Night of My Life is just part of the bigger Foxx picture, rather than an item from his sideline career, it’s still an above-average celebrity album".

Commercial performance
Best Night of My Life debuted at number six on the US Billboard 200 chart, selling 144,000 copies in its first week. This became Foxx's third consecutive US top-ten album. As of January 2015, the album has sold 409,000 copies in the United States.

Track listing 

Notes
 "Yep Dat's Me" has an alternate version featuring rapper T.I. instead of Ludacris

Sample credits
 "Living Better Now" contains an interpolation of "Big Poppa" performed by The Notorious B.I.G.

Charts

Weekly charts

Year-end charts

Release history

References

Jamie Foxx albums
2010 albums
Albums produced by Bink (record producer)
Albums produced by Danja (record producer)
Albums produced by Eric Hudson
Albums produced by Justin Timberlake
Albums produced by Noah "40" Shebib
Albums produced by Rico Love
Albums produced by Kanye West